ZP may refer to:

People:
 Zach Parise, American ice hockey player
 ZP Theart, former vocalist for British power metal band DragonForce
 José Luis Rodríguez Zapatero, former Spanish prime minister, via popular nickname "ZP" (Zapatero Presidente)

Science and mathematics:
 Zp, the ring of p-adic integers
 Zona pellucida, a glycoprotein membrane surrounding the plasma membrane of an oocyte
 Z/pZ, the cyclic group of integers modulo p

Military
 ZP, United States Navy abbreviation for "Airship Patrol Squadron", 1942-1961

Politics
 Zjednoczona Prawica, the Polish United Right party
 Zilla Parishad, district councils in Bangladesh and India